Wansbeck Road is a Tyne and Wear Metro station, serving the suburbs of Coxlodge and Gosforth, Newcastle upon Tyne in Tyne and Wear, England. It joined the network on 10 May 1981, following the opening of the second phase of the network, between South Gosforth and Bank Foot.

History
On 1 March 1905, the line between South Gosforth and Ponteland was opened by the Gosforth and Ponteland Light Railway, with passenger services commencing three months later. Eight years later, the line was extended to Darras Hall, with passenger services commencing on 1 October 1913. 

Wansbeck Road is situated between the former Coxlodge and West Gosforth stations. The line closed to passengers in June 1929, with Coxlodge and West Gosforth stations closing to goods in November 1965 and August 1967 respectively. 

Wansbeck Road is built on an embankment above Wansbeck Road, with platforms located on opposite sides of the road. A second concrete span was added to the original single-track bridge in the late 1970s, during the construction of the Tyne and Wear Metro.

Refurbishment
In 2018, the station, along with others on the branch between South Gosforth and Newcastle Airport, were refurbished. The £300,000 project saw improvements to accessibility, security and energy efficiency, as well as the rebranding of the station to the new black and white corporate colour scheme.

Facilities 
The station has two platforms, both of which have ticket machines (which accept cash, card and contactless payment), smartcard validators, sheltered waiting area, seating, next train audio and visual displays, timetable and information posters and an emergency help point. There is step-free access to both platforms by ramp, with platforms also accessed by stairs. There is cycle storage at the station, with three cycle pods.

Services 
, the station is served by up to five trains per hour on weekdays and Saturday, and up to four trains per hour during the evening and on Sunday between South Hylton and Newcastle Airport.

Rolling stock used: Class 599 Metrocar

Notes

References

Sources

External links
 
 Timetable and station information for Wansbeck Road

Newcastle upon Tyne
1981 establishments in England
Railway stations in Great Britain opened in 1981
Tyne and Wear Metro Green line stations
Transport in Newcastle upon Tyne
Transport in Tyne and Wear
